Lithuania attracts many visitors from neighbouring countries and all over the world. In 2018, 1,7 million foreign visitors arrived to Lithuania for business, family and leisure. Historical legacy of the Grand Duchy of Lithuania, rich history, architecture, pristine nature, seaside and SPA resorts are the main attraction points of Lithuania. Domestic tourism is also highly popular – in 2018 it grew by 12% percent. Lithuanians also prefer to spend their vacations in Lithuania – 70 percent.

Overview 
Lithuania experiences a constant increase of foreign visitors. In 2017, the accommodation establishments of Lithuania received 3.25 million tourists, which is by 6.2 per cent more than in 2016.  Lithuania attracts foreign visitors mostly from Germany, Poland, Russia, Latvia, Belarus, the United Kingdom, Estonia and Finland.

In 2017 hotels received 2.2 million tourists, or by 7 per cent more than in 2016. Number of Lithuanian tourists grew by 12.8 per cent, foreigners – by 3.3 per cent. The hotel room occupancy rate stood at 54.3 per cent (in 2016, 51.7 per cent), the hotel bed occupancy rate – at 41.4 per cent (in 2016, 39.7 per cent).

Agrotourism has also gained extreme popularity in the country among the locals as well as foreigners.
Ecotourism is actively promoted by the government and national parks – Lithuania has built a successful ecotourism industry, and is also been acknowledged as one of the world's most ethical destinations. Hot air ballooning is very popular in Lithuania, especially in Vilnius and Trakai. Theme routes through historical and nature sites are popular among domestic and international tourists. Nemunas Delta Regional Park and Žuvintas biosphere reserve are known for birdwatching.

Tourism information centres operating in all majors cities and smaller towns, national parks and other places, attractive for domestic or international tourism.

If the nature of the tour is that the guide is "interpreting the cultural and natural heritage of an area", Lithuania requires the guide have a guiding license. This definition follows the European standard for tour guiding (CEN). Licensed Tourist Guides are the only professionals permitted to conduct tours in all sites and museums within a city. Licensed guides are required in those areas where the local authorities state that one of them is mandatory. There is a Guides Database to find a guide in your language as well.

Arrivals by country 
Most visitors arriving to Lithuania on short term basis in are from the following countries of nationality:

Major cities 

Vilnius – capital of Lithuania, in the past – capital of the Grand Duchy of Lithuania, first mentioned in Letters of Gediminas in 1323. Vilnius is full of cultural events – new operas, classical music, theatre and music festivals.
Kaunas – temporary interbellum capital of Lithuania with prominent functionalism architecture, art and history museums, largest city Oak Park in Europe.
Klaipėda – sea port with an attractive old town, Lithuanian Sea Museum and Dolphinarium.
Panevėžys – capital of Aukštaitija
Šiauliai –  famous for nearby Hill of Crosses
Telšiai – capital of Samogitia
Kėdainiai – city in central Lithuania with prominent Renaissance architecture monuments

National and regional parks 

Protected areas established for the preservation of natural and cultural features. Lithuania has 30 regional and 5 national parks.
 Aukštaitija National Park
 Žemaitija National Park
 Kuršių Nerija National Park
 Dzūkija National Park
 Trakai Historical National Park

UNESCO World Heritage Sites 
 Kernavė – ancient capital of Lithuania, a complex of historical hillforts and an archeological site, called "Troy of Lithuania"
 Curonian Spit – the resort and nature reserve.
 Vilnius Old Town – the old capital of the Grand Duchy of Lithuania, largest baroque city in Northern Europe, is among the largest historical centres in Europe.

Cultural and Cognitive Routes 

In 2019 Cultural Route of Lithuanian composer Mikalojus Konstantinas Čiurlionis was opened which leads through the places in Varėna, Druskininkai, Kaunas, Vilnius, Plungė, Rietavas, Palanga where composer has lived.

Cognitive or sightseeing routes (Pažintinis takas) are highly popular among domestic tourists. Usually they lead through unique places in nature, where the visitor can enjoy the nature and local history while walking some predefined path.

Resorts

Seaside resorts 
 Palanga – the summer capital of Lithuania with sandy beaches
 Nida – a world heritage site with unique nature
 Juodkrantė – a resort in Neringa

Spa towns 
 Birštonas – a balneological resort and a spa town, surrounded by pine forests.
 Druskininkai – a developed spa town with the largest water park in the Eastern Europe, the Snow Arena – one of the biggest indoor skiing slopes in Europe. The Water Park and the Snow Arena connected with the cable car.
 Likėnai – a resort with mineral springs.

Pilgrimage sites 

Lithuania has many holy sites, especially in Samogitia, which are worth a visit.

Major pilgrimage sites:
 Gate of Dawn (Vilnius)
 Hill of Crosses, (Samogitia)
 Žemaičių Kalvarija, (Samogitia)
 Šiluva, (Samogitia)

Military heritage 
The country has some military sites left and may be very interesting place as a place of militarism heritage tourism. It might be interesting for anyone who is interested in history of the warfare or the Cold War.

Major militarism heritage sites in Lithuania:
Kaunas Fortress, a massive system of forts built around Kaunas during the Russian Empire rule in the 19th century;
Former Soviet Nuclear launch site near Žemaičių Kalvarija in Samogitia.

Bicycle tourism 

Bicycle tourism is growing, especially in Lithuanian Seaside Cycle Route. EuroVelo routes EV10, EV11, EV13 go through Lithuania. Total length of bicycle tracks amounts to
3769 km (of which 1988 km is asphalt pavement). Most known bicycle routes are: Nemunas River Cycle Route, Suvalkija Cycle Circuit, Lithuanian Seaside Cycle Route. Most of the Tourism information centres and national parks have their local thematic bicycle route plans.

Festivals 
Kaziuko mugė
Užgavėnės
Vilnius International Film Festival
Kaunas International Film Festival
Klaipėda Sea Festival

Museums 

Museums include:
 Lithuanian Museum of Ethnocosmology
 Palanga Amber Museum
 Vilnius Amber Museum-Gallery
 Palace of the Grand Dukes of Lithuania
 Church Heritage Museum
 Lithuanian Museum of Ancient Beekeeping
 National Gallery of Art
 M. K. Čiurlionis National Art Museum
 Vytautas the Great War Museum
 National Museum of Lithuania
 Vilnius Castle Complex
 Vilnius Picture Gallery 
 Vilnius Toys' Museum 
 Museum of Occupations and Freedom Fights
 Lithuanian Aviation Museum
 MO Museum – Museum of modern and contemporary Lithuanian art
 Tartle  – Museum of Lithuanian art heritage and artefacts.
 Klaipėda Clock and Watch Museum 
 Šiauliai Photography Museum 
 Akmenė Akemenė fossil museum

Gallery

See also 
 Castles in Lithuania
 Žemaitukas
 List of landmarks in Lithuania
 List of museums in Lithuania
 List of national parks of Lithuania
 List of regional parks of Lithuania

References

External links 

 Lithuania – Real is Beautiful – The Official Travel Guide by the State Department of Tourism
 Lithuanian State Department of Tourism
 
 Lithuania Travel Guide
 Tourism in Lithuania
 Žemaitija National Park’s website
 Lithuanian Guides Database

 
Lithuania